Sir Paul Preston CBE (born 21 July 1946) is an English historian and Hispanist, biographer of Francisco Franco, and specialist in Spanish history, in particular the Spanish Civil War, which he has studied for more than 30 years. He is the winner of multiple awards for his books on the Spanish Civil War.

Biography
Preston was born in 1946 in Liverpool. Preston said in an interview that he has sympathy for the Second Spanish Republic: "I came from a fairly left-wing family. You could not really be from working-class Liverpool and not be left-wing. Emotionally, in my feeling for the Republic I think there is an element of indignation about the Republic's defeat, solidarity with the losing side. Maybe that's why I support Everton, although Everton wasn't the losing side in my day."

Preston studied for his undergraduate degree at Oriel College, Oxford. He then gained an MA in European Studies at the University of Reading. He moved back to Oriel College to gain his PhD.

Since 1991 Preston has taught at the London School of Economics, where he is Príncipe de Asturias Professor of Contemporary Spanish Studies and director of the Cañada Blanch Centre for Contemporary Spanish Studies.

He is a frequent visitor to Spain, where his work appears in Spanish and Catalan. He speaks both languages.

He has a wife, Gabriella, to whom he dedicated The Spanish Holocaust: Inquisition and Extermination in Twentieth-Century Spain.

Publications
Preston has produced a biography of Franco (Basic Books, 1994). He has also published a biography of King Juan Carlos I (2003).

Recent books include ones on the subject of foreign correspondents who reported on the Spanish Civil War and Franco's control of his generals. In 2012 he published the English edition of the Spanish Holocaust. This book represents a challenge to the pact of forgetting, examining the many deaths and atrocities associated with the Spanish Civil War, and following the Francoist repression into the early 1950s.

The book was criticised by Stanley Payne; while Payne did praise Preston for his depth and breadth of research into atrocities in and after the war, he criticised Preston for bias when it came to Republican atrocities, as well as arguing that Preston's characterisation of the Nationalists as planning to exterminate their opponents is contradicted by the fact that the overwhelming majority of the Spanish left was still alive after the wartime and postwar executions, despite being completely at Franco's mercy.  Payne argues that Franco's policy was to simply eliminate the leaders and main activists of the Republicans while letting most of the rank and file go free.

Awards and honours
 2000 2000 Queen's Birthday Honours List Commander of the Order of the British Empire (Civil Division)
 2005 Ramon Llull International Prize
 2006 Grand Cross of the Order of Isabella the Catholic
 2012 Samuel Johnson Prize, shortlist, The Spanish Holocaust
 2013 Honour Prize of the Lluís Carulla's Foundation
 2018 Queen's Birthday Honours List: Knighthood for services to UK/Spain relations.
 2019 Honoris causa Doctorate in the University of Cantabria

Bibliography
 
 
 
 
 
 
 
 
 
 
 
 
 

As Editor

References
Informational notes

Citations

External links
 
 
 Publications by Paul Preston at LSE Research Online
 Paul Preston Interview on The Señales de Humo

1946 births
Living people
Academics from Liverpool
Academics of the London School of Economics
British historians
British biographers
Fellows of the British Academy
British Hispanists
Commanders of the Order of the British Empire
Historians of Spain
People educated at St Edward's College
Alumni of Oriel College, Oxford
Knights Grand Cross of the Order of Isabella the Catholic
Members of the Institute for Catalan Studies
Knights Bachelor
Historians of the Spanish Civil War
Historians of Francoist Spain
Historians of the Spanish transition to democracy
History Today people